The Whoopi Goldberg Show was an American late-night talk show hosted by comedian Whoopi Goldberg that aired in syndication from September 1992 through September 1993 for a total of 112 normal episodes for a 30-minute timeslot Monday through Friday nights (in some markets after 12 AM). The show did not have a band, but Jerry Peters played piano.

References

External links

1992 American television series debuts
1993 American television series endings
1990s American television talk shows
English-language television shows
First-run syndicated television programs in the United States
American late-night television shows
Television series by 20th Century Fox Television